Bala Kula (also Romanized as Bālā Kūlā; also known as Bālā Kolā) is a village in Kolijan Rostaq-e Olya Rural District, Kolijan Rostaq District, Sari County, Mazandaran province, Iran. At the 2006 census, its population was 203, in 47 families.

References 

Populated places in Sari County